The 1912 All-Ireland Senior Hurling Championship was the 26th staging of the All-Ireland hurling championship since its establishment by the Gaelic Athletic Association in 1887. The championship began on 19 May 1912 and ended on 17 November 1912.

Kilkenny were the defending champions, and successfully defended their title following a 2-1 to 1-3 defeat of Cork in the final.

Format

All-Ireland Championship

Semi-finals: (2 matches) The four provincial representatives made up the semi-final pairings.  Two teams are eliminated at this stage while the two winning teams advance to the All-Ireland final.

Final: (1 match) The winners of the two semi-finals contest this game with the winners being declared All-Ireland champions.

Results

Leinster Senior Hurling Championship

Munster Senior Hurling Championship

All-Ireland Senior Hurling Championship

Sources

 Corry, Eoghan, The GAA Book of Lists (Hodder Headline Ireland, 2005).
 Donegan, Des, The Complete Handbook of Gaelic Games (DBA Publications Limited, 2005).
 Fullam, Brendan, Captains of the Ash (Wolfhound Press, 2002).

External links
 1912 All-Ireland Senior Hurling Championship fixtures

References

1912
All-Ireland Senior Hurling Championship